The 2009–10 Ottawa Senators season was the 18th season of the Ottawa Senators of the National Hockey League (NHL). After missing the post-season in 2008–09 for the first time since the 1995–96 season, the team qualified for the playoffs with four games to play with a win against the Carolina Hurricanes on April 1, 2010. The Senators drew the defending Stanley Cup champion Pittsburgh Penguins in the first round, which the Penguins won 4–2.

Off-season 
In early June, left winger Dany Heatley notified general manager Bryan Murray that he wanted a trade out of Ottawa. According to reports, Heatley was dissatisfied with his role and ice time under new head coach Cory Clouston.

On June 15, it was announced that team president Roy Mlakar's contract would not be renewed. Cyril Leeder, one of the principals in the "Bring Back the Sens" drive in 1990 was named as team president. He had previously been president and chief operating officer of Scotiabank Place and the related Senators Sports and Entertainment Corporation.

The team announced its first-ever exhibition game in Regina, Saskatchewan, to be held on September 21 against the Tampa Bay Lightning. It will be the first NHL game in Regina in 19 years.

At the NHL Entry Draft, the team chose defenceman Jared Cowen as their first-round pick, ninth overall. Cowan had been projected as a top-five pick, but had suffered a knee injury during the 2008–09 season. Cowen is tall and is expected to play a "shut-down" role in the future with the Senators.

In the days leading up to the July 1 free agency period, a prospective trade emerged for Dany Heatley with the Edmonton Oilers. Reportedly, the Oilers offered Andrew Cogliano, Dustin Penner and Ladislav Smid. Heatley met with the Edmonton management and turned down the trade using a no-movement clause in his contract. On July 1, the Senators were required to make a $4 million payment in advance of Heatley's 2009–10 salary, and the Senators had hoped to move Heatley before the payment. According to Slam! Sports, the Oilers were not on a list of teams acceptable to Heatley, the list of teams including the Rangers, Bruins, Canucks, Sharks, Kings, Red Wings, Flames and Blackhawks. According to GM Murray, teams were "sour" on Heatley and there were few offers.

The Senators made a major free-agent signing on July 6 when they signed former Montreal Canadiens forward Alexei Kovalev to a two-year contract. Kovalev's salary put the Senators at the salary cap limit. The Senators partially addressed this by trading goaltender Alex Auld to the Dallas Stars for a draft pick. By the date of Kovalev's formal introduction press conference on July 21, Heatley had not yet been traded and Kovalev expressed the wish that Heatley would return.

By the opening of training camp on September 12, Heatley had not been traded. Heatley reported and participated in camp activities. Heatley met with Clouston and Murray who hoped to persuade Heatley to drop his trade demand, which he did not. After the meeting, Murray became convinced that Heatley could not stay and had to be moved immediately. Heatley was traded later that day to the San Jose Sharks for wingers Milan Michalek and Jonathan Cheechoo and an exchange of draft picks. On November 3, it was confirmed that Senators owner Eugene Melnyk filed a grievance to demand that Heatley return a $4 million bonus the Senators paid Heatley on July 1, part of his contract.

Preseason 

|-  style="text-align:center; background:#fcc;"
| 1 || September 15 (in Halifax, NS) || Ottawa Senators || 1-3 || Florida Panthers || || Leclaire || 0-1-0 || 
|-  style="text-align:center; background:#fcc;"
| 2 || September 16 || Florida Panthers || 2-1 || Ottawa Senators || || Brodeur || 0-2-0 || 
|-  style="text-align:center; background:#fcc;"
| 3 || September 18 || Ottawa Senators || 1-2 || Montreal Canadiens || || Lehner || 0-3-0 || 
|-  style="text-align:center; background:#cfc;"
| 4 || September 19 || Montreal Canadiens || 1-6 || Ottawa Senators || || Leclaire || 1-3-0 || 
|-  style="text-align:center; background:#cfc;"
| 5 || September 21 (in Regina, SK) || Ottawa Senators || 3-1 || Tampa Bay Lightning || || Elliott || 2-3-0 || 
|-  style="text-align:center; background:#fcc;"
| 6 || September 25 || Boston Bruins || 2-1 || Ottawa Senators || || Leclaire || 2-4-0 || 
|-

Regular season 
The Senators started the season with several changes from the previous season. Heatley was traded, Christoph Schubert was demoted to Binghamton and eventually waived to Atlanta; Brian Lee who had played most of the previous season with Ottawa, was also demoted. Newcomers included Michalek and Cheechoo from the Heatley trade, Kovalev, a free agent signing, and Matt Carkner and Erik Karlsson made the team on defence. Before the end of October, Karlsson was demoted to Binghamton and Lee promoted to Ottawa. First round pick Jared Cowen was returned to junior. Ilya Zubov failed to make the team and was demoted to Binghamton. Zubov first demanded a trade, then accepted a contract reassignment to Salavat Yulaev Ufa of the Kontinental Hockey League (KHL). The Senators retain his NHL rights.

In December, the Senators started to run into a streak of injuries. By the end of the month, the entire top line of Michalek, Spezza and Alfredsson was out with injuries.

On January 13, 2010, the Senators fired their goaltending coach, Eli Wilson. In the weeks prior to his firing, both Pascal Leclaire and Brian Elliott had poor outings. After the firing, the Senators went on a franchise and all-time team record win streak. The previous record of the current NHL franchise was eight games, set in 2007–08. The Senators passed that on January 30, with a win over the Canadiens. The Senators then passed their all-time record of ten consecutive wins (set twice — in 1908–09 and 1910) with a win over the Vancouver Canucks on February 4. The streak ended on February 6 with a loss to the Maple Leafs.

On February 12, the Senators made two moves. The club extended Bryan Murray's contract by a year and the club traded for Matt Cullen from the Carolina Hurricanes for Alexandre Picard and a second-round pick in the 2010 NHL Entry Draft. Following the trade, Jonathan Cheechoo was assigned to Binghamton after clearing NHL waivers.

Standings

Game log 

|-  style="text-align:center; background:#fcc;"
| 1 || October 3 || @ New York Rangers || 2 – 5 || Madison Square Garden (18,200) || Leclaire || 0–1–0 || 
|-  style="text-align:center; background:#cfc;"
| 2 || October 6 || @ Toronto Maple Leafs || 2 – 1 || Air Canada Centre (18,830) || Leclaire || 1–1–0 || 
|-  style="text-align:center; background:#cfc;"
| 3 || October 8 || New York Islanders || 3 – 2 (OT) || Scotiabank Place (18,075) || Leclaire || 2-1-0 || 
|-  style="text-align:center; background:#cfc;"
| 4 || October 10 || Atlanta Thrashers || 4 – 2 || Scotiabank Place (19,360) || Elliott || 3-1-0 || 
|-  style="text-align:center; background:#fcc;"
| 5 || October 12 || Pittsburgh Penguins || 1 – 4 || Scotiabank Place (17,014) || Leclaire || 3–2–0 || 
|-  style="text-align:center; background:#cfc;"
| 6 || October 15 || Tampa Bay Lightning || 7 – 1 || Scotiabank Place (17,732) || Leclaire || 4–2–0 || 
|-  style="text-align:center; background:#cfc;"
| 7 || October 17 || @ Montreal Canadiens || 3 – 1 || Bell Centre (21,273) || Leclaire || 5–2–0 || 
|- style="text-align:center;"
| 8 || October 22 || Nashville Predators || 5 – 6 (OT) || Scotiabank Place (18,970)|| Leclaire || 5–2–1 || 
|- style="text-align:center;"
| 9 || October 24 || Boston Bruins || 3 – 4 (SO) || Scotiabank Place (20,154) || Elliott || 5–2–2 || 
|-  style="text-align:center; background:#cfc;"
| 10 || October 28 || @ Florida Panthers || 4 – 3 || BankAtlantic Center (12,596) || Leclaire || 6–2–2 || 
|-  style="text-align:center; background:#fcc;"
| 11 || October 29 || @ Tampa Bay Lightning || 2 – 5 || St. Pete Times Forum (13,213) || Elliott || 6–3–2 || 
|-  style="text-align:center; background:#fcc;"
| 12 || October 31 || Atlanta Thrashers || 1 – 3 || Scotiabank Place (17,297) || Leclaire || 6–4–2 || 
|-

|-  style="text-align:center; background:#cfc;"
| 13 || November 5 || Tampa Bay Lightning || 3 – 2 (OT)|| Scotiabank Place (17,511) || Leclaire || 7–4–2 || 
|-  style="text-align:center; background:#fcc;"
| 14 || November 7 || New Jersey Devils || 2 – 3 || Scotiabank Place (18,781) || Leclaire || 7–5–2 || 
|-  style="text-align:center; background:#cfc;"
| 15 || November 10 || Edmonton Oilers || 4 – 3 (SO) || Scotiabank Place (17,977) || Leclaire || 8–5–2 || 
|-  style="text-align:center; background:#fcc;"
| 16 || November 12 || @ Philadelphia Flyers || 1 – 5 || Wachovia Center (19,321) || Leclaire || 8–6–2 || 
|- style="text-align:center;"
| 17 || November 14 || New York Rangers || 1 – 2 (SO) || Scotiabank Place (17,561) || Elliott || 8–6–3 || 
|-  style="text-align:center; background:#cfc;"
| 18 || November 17 || Toronto Maple Leafs || 3 – 2 || Scotiabank Place (17,406) || Leclaire || 9–6–3|| 
|-  style="text-align:center; background:#cfc;"
| 19 || November 19 || Pittsburgh Penguins || 6 – 2 || Scotiabank Place (17,039) || Leclaire || 10–6–3 || 
|-  style="text-align:center; background:#cfc;"
| 20 || November 21 || Buffalo Sabres || 5 – 3 || Scotiabank Place (17,206) || Elliott || 11–6–3 || 
|-  style="text-align:center; background:#cfc;"
| 21 || November 23 || Washington Capitals || 4 – 3 (OT) || Scotiabank Place (16,210) || Elliott || 12-6-3 || 
|-  style="text-align:center; background:#fcc;"
| 22 || November 25 || @ New Jersey Devils || 1 – 3 || Prudential Center (14,056) || Elliott || 12-7-3 || 
|-  style="text-align:center; background:#cfc;"
| 23 || November 26 || Columbus Blue Jackets || 2 – 1 || Scotiabank Place (19,244) || Elliott || 13–7–3 || 
|- style="text-align:center;"
| 24 || November 28 || @ Boston Bruins || 3 – 4 (SO) || TD Garden (17,565) || Elliott || 13-7-4 ||
|-

|-  style="text-align:center; background:#fcc;"
| 25 || December 1 || @ San Jose Sharks || 2 – 5 || HP Pavilion (17,562) || Elliott || 13-8-4 || 
|-  style="text-align:center; background:#fcc;"
| 26 || December 3 || @ Los Angeles Kings || 3 – 6 || Staples Center (14,997) || Elliott || 13-9-4 || 
|-  style="text-align:center; background:#fcc;"
| 27 || December 5 || @ Phoenix Coyotes || 2 – 3 || Jobing.com Arena (8,642) || Elliott || 13-10-4 || 
|-  style="text-align:center; background:#cfc;"
| 28 || December 6 || @ Anaheim Ducks || 4 – 3 (SO) || Honda Center (14,946) || Elliott || 14–10–4 || 
|-  style="text-align:center; background:#fcc;"
| 29 || December 8 || Montreal Canadiens || 1 – 4 || Scotiabank Place (18,866) || Elliott || 14-11-4 || 
|-  style="text-align:center; background:#cfc;"
| 30 || December 10 || @ Philadelphia Flyers || 2 – 0 || Wachovia Center (19,706) || Elliott || 15-11-4 || 
|-  style="text-align:center; background:#cfc;"
| 31 || December 12 || Carolina Hurricanes || 4 – 2 || Scotiabank Place (16,229) || Elliott || 16-11-4 || 
|-  style="text-align:center; background:#fcc;"
| 32 || December 14 || @ Toronto Maple Leafs || 2 – 3 || Air Canada Centre (19,315) || Elliott || 16-12-4 || 
|-  style="text-align:center; background:#cfc;"
| 33 || December 16 || Buffalo Sabres || 2 – 0 || Scotiabank Place (16,917) || Elliott || 17-12-4 || 
|-  style="text-align:center; background:#fcc;"
| 34 || December 18 || @ New Jersey Devils || 2 – 4 || Prudential Center (13,728) || Elliott || 17-13-4 || 
|-  style="text-align:center; background:#cfc;"
| 35 || December 19 || Minnesota Wild || 4 – 1 || Scotiabank Place (16,259) || Brodeur || 18-13-4 || 
|-  style="text-align:center; background:#fcc;"
| 36 || December 21 || Boston Bruins || 0 – 2 || Scotiabank Place (19,865) || Elliott || 18-14-4 || 
|-  style="text-align:center; background:#fcc;"
| 37 || December 23 || @ Pittsburgh Penguins || 2 – 8 || Mellon Arena (17,132) || Elliott || 18-15-4 || 
|-  style="text-align:center; background:#cfc;"
| 38 || December 26 || @ Buffalo Sabres || 3 – 2 (SO) || HSBC Arena (18,690) || Leclaire || 19-15-4 || 
|-  style="text-align:center; background:#cfc;"
| 39 || December 28 || Montreal Canadiens || 4 – 2 || Scotiabank Place (20,369) || Leclaire || 20-15-4 || 
|-  style="text-align:center; background:#fcc;"
| 40 || December 30 || Colorado Avalanche || 3 – 4 || Scotiabank Place (17,823) || Leclaire || 20–16–4 || 
|-  style="text-align:center; background:#cfc;"
| 41 || December 31 || New York Islanders || 3 – 2 (SO)  || Scotiabank Place (16,743) || Leclaire || 21–16–4 || 
|-

|-  style="text-align:center; background:#cfc;"
| 42 || January 3 || Philadelphia Flyers || 7 – 4 || Scotiabank Place (17,153) || Elliott || 22–16–4 || 
|-  style="text-align:center; background:#fcc;"
| 43 || January 5 || Boston Bruins || 1 – 4 || Scotiabank Place (19,156) || Elliott || 22-17-4 || 
|-  style="text-align:center; background:#fcc;"
| 44 || January 7 || @ Washington Capitals || 2 – 5 || Verizon Center (18,277) || Leclaire || 22-18-4 || 
|-  style="text-align:center; background:#fcc;"
| 45 || January 9 || Florida Panthers || 0 – 3 || Scotiabank Place (16,506) || Elliott || 22-19-4 || 
|-  style="text-align:center; background:#fcc;"
| 46 || January 10 || @ Carolina Hurricanes || 1 – 4 || RBC Center (16,892) || Leclaire || 22-20-4 || 
|-  style="text-align:center; background:#fcc;"
| 47 || January 12 || @ Atlanta Thrashers || 1 – 6 || Philips Arena (10,017) || Leclaire || 22–21–4 || 
|-  style="text-align:center; background:#cfc;"
| 48 || January 14 || @ New York Rangers || 2 – 0 || Madison Square Garden (18,200) || Brodeur || 23–21–4 || 
|-  style="text-align:center; background:#cfc;"
| 49 || January 16 || @ Montreal Canadiens || 4 – 2 || Bell Centre (21,273)|| Brodeur || 24–21–4 || 
|-  style="text-align:center; background:#cfc;"
| 50 || January 18 || @ Boston Bruins || 5 – 1 || TD Garden (17,565) || Elliott || 25–21–4 || 
|-  style="text-align:center; background:#cfc;"
| 51 || January 19 || Chicago Blackhawks || 4 – 1 || Scotiabank Place (17,556)|| Elliott || 26–21–4 || 
|-  style="text-align:center; background:#cfc;"
| 52 || January 21 || St. Louis Blues || 3 – 2 || Scotiabank Place (16,063)|| Elliott || 27–21–4 || 
|-  style="text-align:center; background:#cfc;"
| 53 || January 23 || @ Boston Bruins || 2 – 1 || TD Garden (17,565)|| Elliott || 28–21–4 || 
|-  style="text-align:center; background:#cfc;"
| 54 || January 26 || New Jersey Devils || 3 – 0 || Scotiabank Place (18,107)|| Elliott || 29–21–4 || 
|-  style="text-align:center; background:#cfc;"
| 55 || January 28 || @ Pittsburgh Penguins || 4 – 1 || Mellon Arena (17,084) || Elliott ||30–21–4 || 
|-  style="text-align:center; background:#cfc;"
| 56 || January 30 || Montreal Canadiens || 3 – 2 || Scotiabank Place (20,500) || Elliott || 31–21–4 || 
|-

|-  style="text-align:center; background:#cfc;"
| 57 || February 3 || @ Buffalo Sabres || 4 – 2 || HSBC Arena (18,690) || Elliott || 32–21–4 || 
|-  style="text-align:center; background:#cfc;"
| 58 || February 4 || Vancouver Canucks || 3 – 1 || Scotiabank Place (18,803) || Elliott || 33–21–4 || 
|-  style="text-align:center; background:#fcc;"
| 59 || February 6 || @ Toronto Maple Leafs || 0 – 5 || Air Canada Centre (19,426) || Elliott || 33–22–4 || 
|-  style="text-align:center; background:#cfc;"
| 60 || February 9 || Calgary Flames || 3 – 2 || Scotiabank Place (18,682)|| Elliott || 34-22-4 || 
|-  style="text-align:center; background:#cfc;"
| 61 || February 11 || Washington Capitals || 6 – 5 || Scotiabank Place (19,682) || Elliott || 35-22-4 || 
|-  style="text-align:center; background:#fcc;"
| 62 || February 13 || @ Detroit Red Wings || 1 – 4 || Joe Louis Arena (20,066) || Elliott || 35-23-4 || 
|-  style="text-align:center; background:#cfc;"
| 63 || February 14 || @ New York Islanders || 4 – 3 || Nassau Veterans Memorial Coliseum (11,297) || Elliott || 36-23-4 || 
|-

|-  style="text-align:center; background:#fcc;"
| 64 || March 2 || New York Rangers || 1 – 4 || Scotiabank Place (18,254) || Elliott || 36-24-4 || 
|-  style="text-align:center; background:#fcc;"
| 65 || March 4 || @ Carolina Hurricanes || 1 – 4 || RBC Center (17,048) || Leclaire  || 36-25-4 || 
|-  style="text-align:center; background:#fff;"
| 66 || March 6 || Toronto Maple Leafs || 1 – 2 (SO) || Scotiabank Place (20,036) || Leclaire || 36-25-5 || 
|-  style="text-align:center; background:#cfc;"
| 67 || March 9 || @ Edmonton Oilers || 4 – 1 || Rexall Place (16,839) || Elliott || 37-25-5 || 
|-  style="text-align:center; background:#fcc;"
| 68 || March 11 || @ Calgary Flames || 0 – 2 || Pengrowth Saddledome (19,289) || Elliott || 37-26-5 || 
|-  style="text-align:center; background:#fcc;"
| 69 || March 13 || @ Vancouver Canucks || 1 – 5 || General Motors Place (18,810) || Leclaire || 37-27-5 || 
|-  style="text-align:center; background:#fcc;"
| 70 || March 16 || Toronto Maple Leafs || 4 – 1 || Scotiabank Place (20,405) || Elliott || 37-28-5 || 
|-  style="text-align:center; background:#fcc;"
| 71 || March 18 || @ Atlanta Thrashers || 3 – 6 || Philips Arena (12,718)|| Elliott || 37-29-5|| 
|-  style="text-align:center; background:#fcc;"
| 72 || March 20 || @ Dallas Stars || 4 – 5 || American Airlines Arena (17,110) || Leclaire || 37-30-5 || 
|-  style="text-align:center; background:#cfc;"
| 73 || March 22 || @ Montreal Canadiens || 2 – 0 || Bell Centre (21,273) || Elliott || 38-30-5  || 
|-  style="text-align:center; background:#cfc;"
| 74 || March 23 || Philadelphia Flyers || 2 – 0 || Scotiabank Place (19,209) || Elliott || 39-30-5|| 
|-  style="text-align:center; background:#cfc;"
| 75 || March 26 || @ Buffalo Sabres || 4 – 2 || HSBC Arena (18,690) || Elliott || 40-30-5 || 
|-  style="text-align:center; background:#cfc;"
| 76 || March 27 || Florida Panthers || 3 – 2 || Scotiabank Place (18,689) || Elliott || 41-30-5 || 
|-  style="text-align:center; background:#cfc;"
| 77 || March 30 || @ Washington Capitals || 5 – 4 (OT) || Verizon Center (18,277) || Elliott || 42-30-5 || 
|-

|-  style="text-align:center; background:#cfc;"
| 78 || April 1 || Carolina Hurricanes || 4 – 3 (SO) || Scotiabank Place (19,152) || Elliott || 43-30-5 || 
|-  style="text-align:center; background:#fcc;"
| 79 || April 3 || @ New York Islanders || 1 – 4 || Nassau Veterans Memorial Coliseum (11,942) || Elliott || 43-31-5 || 
|-  style="text-align:center; background:#cfc;"
| 80 || April 6 || @ Florida Panthers || 5 – 2 || BankAtlantic Center (11,790) || Leclaire || 44-31-5|| 
|-  style="text-align:center; background:#fff;"
| 81 || April 8 || @ Tampa Bay Lightning || 3 – 4 (SO) || St. Pete Times Forum (15,876)|| Elliott ||44-31-6 || 
|-  style="text-align:center; background:#fcc;"
| 82 || April 10 || Buffalo Sabres || 2 – 5 || Scotiabank Place (20,500) || Leclaire || 44–32–6 || 
|-

|-
| 2009–10 Schedule
|-
| Legend:

Playoffs 

After failing to qualify in 2008–09, the Senators clinched a spot in the 2010 Stanley Cup playoffs on April 1, 2010 with a 4-3 shootout win at home against the Carolina Hurricanes.  Previous media predictions of where the Senators would end up ranged from fourth in the conference to out of the playoffs. The Hockey News had placed the Senators ninth in the conference, while ESPN's John Buccigross predicted the Senators would end up in eleventh. Las Vegas odds had put the odds of the Senators winning the Cup at 35–1.

The Senators drew the defending champion Penguins as first-round opponents for the third time in the past four years. After the Senators won the first game in Pittsburgh, the Penguins took the next three to take a commanding 3–1 lead in the series. The Senators won the fifth game in triple overtime to force a sixth game in Ottawa. In the sixth game, the Senators took a 3–0 lead before the Penguins rallied to win the deciding game 4–3 in overtime to end the Senators season.

|-  style="text-align:center; background:#cfc;"
| 1 || April 14 ||  5 – 4 || Mellon Arena (17,132) || Elliott || 1–0 || 
|-  style="text-align:center; background:#fcc;"
| 2 || April 16 || 1 – 2  || Mellon Arena (17,132) || Elliott || 1–1 || 
|-  style="text-align:center; background:#fcc;"
| 3 || April 18 || 2 – 4  || Scotiabank Place (20,119) || Elliott || 1–2 || 
|-  style="text-align:center; background:#fcc;"
| 4 || April 20 || 4 – 7 || Scotiabank Place (20,014) || Leclaire || 1–3 || 
|-  style="text-align:center; background:#cfc;"
| 5 || April 22 || 4 – 3 (3OT)  || Mellon Arena (17,132) || Leclaire || 2–3 || 
|-  style="text-align:center; background:#fcc;"
| 6 || April 24 || 3 – 4 (1OT)  || Scotiabank Place (20,122) || Leclaire || 2–4 || 
|-

Player statistics

Skaters

Goaltenders

†Denotes player spent time with another team before joining Senators. Stats reflect time with Senators only.
‡Traded mid-season.

Awards and records

Milestones

Awards

Records
 January 14, 2010 – February 4, 2010: Eleven-game win streak, modern franchise record.
 April 22, 2010: Senators defeat Penguins in triple overtime on a goal by Matt Carkner at 7:06, ending the longest game in modern franchise history.

Transactions 

The Senators have been involved in the following transactions during the 2009–10 season.

Trades

|}

Free agents acquired

Free agents lost

Claimed via waivers

Lost via waivers

Lost via retirement

Player signings

Draft picks 

The 2009 NHL Entry Draft was held in Montreal on June 26–27, 2009.  Ottawa made the following picks:

Farm teams 
 Binghamton Senators (American Hockey League)Don Nachbaur was hired as the new head coach of Binghamton on July 17.
 Elmira Jackals (ECHL)

See also 
 2009–10 NHL season

References 

2009–10 NHL season by team
2009-10
2009–10 in Canadian ice hockey by team